Harvest was a DARPA funded research project by the Internet Research Task Force Research Group on Resource Discovery and hosted at the  University of Colorado at Boulder which provided a web cache, developed standards such as the Internet Cache Protocol and Summary Object Interchange Format, and spawned many other technologies and software products.

After the conclusion of the project in 1996, development of the Harvest object cache was continued with the University of Edinburgh releasing version 1.5.  The open source squid cache and commercial NetCache were both based on the Harvest object cache.

References

External links 
 Harvest: A Scalable, Customizable Discovery and Access System
 Harvest User's Manual
 harvest.transarc.com/, Wayback Machine
 https://web.archive.org/web/20110510031651/http://harvest.cs.colorado.edu/ 
 An adaptive caching and replication mechanism for WWW, June 1997
 Caching on JANET
 Cached-1.4 ChangeLog

Web caching protocol